Polman is a Dutch toponymic surname. It may be a local (Gelderland) form of the surname Poelman, referring to someone living near a pool or small lake,  or refer to someone living on pol, a name used in the Eastern Netherlands for raised land. People with this name include:

Albert Polman (born 1961), Dutch physicist
Connie Polman-Tuin (born 1963), Canadian heptathlete
Dick Polman (born 1950s), American political journalist
Estavana Polman (born 1992), Dutch handball player
Han Polman (born 1963), Dutch D66 politician, King's Commissioner of Zeeland
Linda Polman (born 1960), Dutch journalist and author on humanitarian aid
Marc Polmans (born 1997), South African-born Australian tennis player
Paul Polman (born 1956), Dutch businessman, CEO of Unilever

See also
Polman Stadion, football stadium in Almelo, Netherlands, named after a sponsor (Pim Polman, born 1937)

References

Dutch-language surnames
Toponymic surnames